Hygrostola is a genus of moths of the family Noctuidae described by Warren in 1913.

Species
 Hygrostola homomunda D. S. Fletcher, 1961
 Hygrostola robusta (Hampson, 1894)

References

Hadeninae